Del rancho a la televisión ("From the Ranch to the Television") is a 1953 Mexican film. It stars Luis Aguilar.

Plot
A young country boy moves to Mexico City to become a singer.  A young girl and her father support him and help him on his road to fame.  Unfortunately, his success is boycotted by a jealous woman.

Cast
Luis Aguilar
Maria Victoria
Chela Campos
Carlos Orellana
Andrés Soler
Emma Rodriguez

References

External links
 

1953 films
1950s Spanish-language films
Mexican comedy-drama films
1953 comedy-drama films
Mexican black-and-white films
1950s Mexican films